Mélin is a village of Wallonia and a district of the municipality of Jodoigne, located in the province of Walloon Brabant, Belgium.

Mélin is a member of the Les Plus Beaux Villages de Wallonie ("The Most Beautiful Villages of Wallonia") association.

References

External links

Former municipalities of Walloon Brabant
Jodoigne